Buildings, sites, districts, and objects in Delaware listed on the National Register of Historic Places:

- for Dover, see:  Kent County
- for Georgetown, see:  Sussex County
- for Newark, see:  Northern New Castle County
- for Wilmington, see:  Wilmington

Contents:  Divisions in Delaware

Current listings by county 

The following are approximate tallies of current listings by county. These counts are based on entries in the National Register Information Database as of April 24, 2008 and new weekly listings posted since then on the National Register of Historic Places web site. There are frequent additions to the listings and occasional delistings and the counts here are approximate and not official. New entries are added to the official Register on a weekly basis. Also, the counts in this table exclude boundary increase and decrease listings which modify the area covered by an existing property or district and which carry a separate National Register reference number. The numbers of NRHP listings in each county are documented by tables in each of the individual county list-articles.

Gallery

See also 

 List of National Historic Landmarks in Delaware
 List of bridges on the National Register of Historic Places in Delaware

References 

Delaware